Gimnástica Medinense is a Spanish football team based in Medina del Campo, Valladolid, in the autonomous community of Castile and León. Founded in 1960, it plays in Primera Provincial – Valladolid, holding home matches at Estadio Municipal de Medina del Campo, which has a capacity of 700 people.

History
Founded in 1960 as Sociedad Deportiva Gimnástica Medinense, the club achieved promotion to Tercera División in 1962, as champions. After five seasons in the fourth tier, the club suffered relegation back to the regional leagues, only returning to the fourth tier in 1980.

In 1988, Gimnástica Medinense achieved promotion to Segunda División B for the first time in their history, but was immediately relegated back. They also remain as the only club of the province outside of the city of Valladolid which played in the third division.

Club background
 Sociedad Deportiva Gimnástica Medinense (1960–2007)
 Gimnástica Medinense (2007–present)

Season to season

1 season in Segunda División B
26 seasons in Tercera División

References

External links
 
ArefePedia team profile 

Football clubs in Castile and León
Association football clubs established in 1960
1960 establishments in Spain
Medina del Campo